Popinjay  may refer to:

 Old-fashioned term for a parrot (cf. Old French papegeai and papegai, German Papagei )
 A dandy or foppish person
 Popinjay (sport), a shooting sport that can be performed with either rifles or archery equipment
 Popinjay, Stibochiona nicea, a species of butterfly
 Popinjay (Wild Cards), a Wild Cards character
 Popinjays, a British indie pop band
 Corporal Popinjay, a Catch-22 character